Fort Maitland was a military fort built by the United States Army at what is now Maitland, Florida. It was built in November 1838 as a supply depot during the Second Seminole War. The fort was named after Captain W. S. Maitland, who was injured during the Battle of Wahoo Swamp and later killed himself after 9 months of trying to recover from his injuries.

See also 
Chris Kimball's website on Second Seminole Indian War ~down 7-17-2014
Fort Maitland's history from official city website

Maitland
Buildings and structures in Orange County, Florida
Maitland
Pre-statehood history of Florida
Maitland, Florida
1838 establishments in Florida Territory
Second Seminole War fortifications